Mark John Shelton (born 12 September 1996) is an English professional footballer who plays as a midfielder for National League club Oldham Athletic.

Career

Burton Albion
Shelton came through the youth teams at Burton Albion before being awarded a professional contract with the club in May 2015.

In January 2016 he joined Loughborough Dynamo on loan until the end of the season. On his return from the loan he was released by the club.

Ilkeston
He then joined Ilkeston in June 2016.

Alfreton Town
In November 2016 he joined Alfreton Town.

Salford City
In June 2017 he joined Salford City after the clubs agreed a fee. In a 3–1 win against Boreham Wood, Shelton scored a goal which would later be voted as Salford's goal of the season. On 11 May 2019, Shelton was a substitute in the 68th minute for Salford in their 3–0 play-off Final win against AFC Fylde at Wembley. After two seasons helping the club to successive promotions to the English Football League, he made his league debut for the club on 3 August 2019 in the club's first game in the league against Stevenage.

Woking and Hartlepool United loans
On 11 October 2019, Shelton returned to the National League, to join Woking on a three-month loan. A day later, he went on to score on his debut during a 2–2 draw with Barnet, netting Woking's second in the 53rd minute. On 16 November 2019, it was confirmed by manager, Alan Dowson that Shelton's loan spell had been terminated, following limited game-time opportunities.

In December 2019 he went out on loan to Hartlepool United. Shelton made his league Hartlepool debut in a 1–0 victory against Dagenham & Redbridge and scored his first goal in a 2–1 win against Eastleigh.

Hartlepool United
After a successful loan spell at the North East club, Hartlepool made the deal permanent on 1 August 2020, following Shelton's release from parent club Salford City. He started in the first game of the season in a 2–1 win against Aldershot Town. His first goal of the 2020–21 season came in a 1–1 draw at FC Halifax Town. Shelton played in the 2021 National League play-off Final as Hartlepool drew 1–1 with Torquay United at Ashton Gate, Bristol. During the Final, Shelton covered 22 kilometres in distance. In the resulting penalty shoot-out, Shelton scored his penalty as Hartlepool were promoted to League Two after winning 5–4 on penalties. 

After a successful 2020–21 season, Shelton extended  his contract with Hartlepool ahead of the 2021–22 season. In April 2022, Shelton was ruled out of the Scunthorpe United fixture after a cotton bud was stuck in his ear, forcing him to go to hospital to remove it. At the end of the 2021–22 season, Shelton's contract was extended for a further year after making 41 appearances in the previous season. Shelton made his 100th appearance for Hartlepool in September 2022. Following several first team injuries, Shelton was moved into defence and scored in a 3–3 draw with Harrogate Town.

Oldham Athletic
On 20 January 2023, Shelton signed for National League side Oldham Athletic on a deal until summer 2025.

Career statistics

Honours
Salford City
National League play-offs: 2019
National League North: 2017–18

Hartlepool United
National League play-offs: 2021

References

External links
Profile at the Salford City F.C. website

1996 births
Living people
Footballers from Nottingham
English footballers
Association football midfielders
Alfreton Town F.C. players
Burton Albion F.C. players
Ilkeston F.C. players
Loughborough Dynamo F.C. players
Nottingham Forest F.C. players
Salford City F.C. players
Woking F.C. players
Hartlepool United F.C. players
Oldham Athletic A.F.C. players
English Football League players
National League (English football) players